The 2019–20 BFA Senior League was the 29th season of the BFA Senior League, the top division football competition in Bahamas. The season began on 12 January 2020 and was postponed during the sixth round of matches due to the COVID-19 pandemic. The season will be followed by a four-team playoff to determine the champion of the league, who will automatically qualify for the 2021 Caribbean Club Shield. Dynamos are the defending champions from the previous season.

Regular season
As opposed to the previous season, the two divisions were merged to create a single division of 11 teams. Bahamas First Stars withdrew from the league prior to the first round of matches.

Playoffs
Following the conclusion of the season, the top four teams in the league will advance to a single-elimination playoff to determine the champion.

References

BFA Senior League seasons
Bahamas
BFA Senior League, 2019-20